Rosemill is a neighborhood in southwestern Lexington, Kentucky, United States. Its boundaries are Southland Drive and Rosemont Garden to the north, Clays Mill Road to the west, and Hill-N-Dale Road to the south. Lexington Catholic High School has been located in the center of the neighborhood since 1957.

Neighborhood statistics
 Area: 
 Population: 812
 Population density: 3,330 people per square mile
 Median household income: $56,483

External links
 http://www.city-data.com/neighborhood/Rosemill-Lexington-KY.html

Neighborhoods in Lexington, Kentucky